The men's 10 metre platform, also reported as high diving, was one of four diving events on the diving at the 1928 Summer Olympics programme. The competition was actually held from both 10 metre and 5 metre boards. Divers performed four compulsory dives – running plain dive, backward somersault (5 metre platform), standing plain dive, running plain dive (10 metre platform) – and four dives of the competitor's choice (different from the compulsory), from either platform, for a total of eight dives. The competition was held from Thursday 9 August 1928 to Saturday 11 August 1928. Twenty-four divers from twelve nations competed.

Results

First round
The three divers who scored the smallest number of points in each group of the first round advanced to the final.

Group 1

Group 2

Group 3

Final

Simiaka was originally announced as the winner of the competition, and the Egyptian national anthem was played. The officials then declared that a mistake had been made, and that the number of judges ranking the diver higher, not total points or score, determined the winner. Four of the five judges had placed Desjardins 1st and Simaika 2nd; only one judge had Simaika 1st and Desjardins 2nd. Consequently, Desjardins was awarded his second gold medal.

References

Sources
 
 

Men
1928
Men's events at the 1928 Summer Olympics